Psoriatic arthritis (PsA) is a long-term inflammatory arthritis that occurs in people affected by the autoimmune disease psoriasis. The classic feature of psoriatic arthritis is swelling of entire fingers and toes with a sausage-like appearance ("sausage digit"). This often happens in association with changes to the nails such as small depressions in the nail (pitting), thickening of the nails, and detachment of the nail from the nailbed. Skin changes consistent with psoriasis (e.g., red, scaly, and itchy plaques) frequently occur before the onset of psoriatic arthritis but psoriatic arthritis can precede the rash in 15% of affected individuals. It is classified as a type of seronegative spondyloarthropathy.

Genetics are thought to be strongly involved in the development of psoriatic arthritis. Obesity and certain forms of psoriasis are thought to increase the risk. 

Psoriatic arthritis affects up to 30% of people with psoriasis and occurs in both children and adults. Approximately 40–50% of individuals with psoriatic arthritis have the HLA-B27 genotype. The condition is less common in people of Asian or African descent and affects men and women equally.

Signs and symptoms 

Pain, swelling, or stiffness in one or more joints is commonly present in psoriatic arthritis. Psoriatic arthritis is inflammatory, and affected joints are generally red or warm to the touch. Asymmetrical oligoarthritis, defined as inflammation affecting two to four joints during the first six months of disease, is present in 70% of cases. However, in 15% of cases, the arthritis is symmetrical. The joints of the hand that is involved in psoriasis are the proximal interphalangeal (PIP), the distal interphalangeal (DIP), the metacarpophalangeal (MCP), and the wrist. Involvement of the distal interphalangeal joints (DIP) is a characteristic feature and is present in 15% of cases.

In addition to affecting the joints of the hands and wrists, psoriatic arthritis may affect the fingers, nails, and skin. Sausage-like swelling in the fingers or toes, known as dactylitis, may occur. Psoriasis can also cause changes to the nails, such as pitting or separation from the nail bed, onycholysis, hyperkeratosis under the nails, and horizontal ridging. Psoriasis classically presents with scaly skin lesions, which are most commonly seen over extensor surfaces such as the scalp, natal cleft and umbilicus.

In psoriatic arthritis, pain can occur in the area of the sacrum (the lower back, above the tailbone), as a result of sacroiliitis or spondylitis, which is present in 40% of cases. Pain can occur in and around the feet and ankles, especially enthesitis in the Achilles tendon (inflammation of the Achilles tendon where it inserts into the bone) or plantar fasciitis in the sole of the foot.

Along with the above-noted pain and inflammation, there is extreme exhaustion that does not go away with adequate rest. The exhaustion may last for days or weeks without abatement. Psoriatic arthritis may remain mild or may progress to more destructive joint disease. Periods of active disease, or flares, will typically alternate with periods of remission. In severe forms, psoriatic arthritis may progress to arthritis mutilans which on X-ray gives a "pencil-in-cup" appearance.

Because prolonged inflammation can lead to joint damage, early diagnosis and treatment to slow or prevent joint damage is recommended.

Causes 

The exact causes are not yet known, however silica dust exposure has been identified in Australia and a number of genetic associations have been identified in a genome-wide association study of psoriasis and psoriatic arthritis including HLA-B27.

Diagnosis 

There is no definitive test to diagnose psoriatic arthritis. Symptoms of psoriatic arthritis may closely resemble other diseases, including rheumatoid arthritis. A rheumatologist (a physician specializing in autoimmune diseases) may use physical examinations, health history, blood tests and x-rays to accurately diagnose psoriatic arthritis.

Factors that contribute to a diagnosis of psoriatic arthritis include the following:

 Psoriasis in the patient, or a family history of psoriasis or psoriatic arthritis.
 A negative test result for rheumatoid factor, a blood factor associated with rheumatoid arthritis.
 Arthritis symptoms in the distal Interphalangeal articulations of hand (the joints closest to the tips of the fingers). This is not typical of rheumatoid arthritis.
 Ridging or pitting of fingernails or toenails (onycholysis), which is associated with psoriasis and psoriatic arthritis.
 Radiologic images demonstrating degenerative joint changes.

Other symptoms that are more typical of psoriatic arthritis than other forms of arthritis include enthesitis (inflammation in the Achilles tendon (at the back of the heel) or the plantar fascia (bottom of the feet)), and dactylitis (sausage-like swelling of the fingers or toes).

Differential diagnosis
Several conditions can mimic the clinical presentation of psoriatic arthritis including rheumatoid arthritis, osteoarthritis, reactive arthritis, gouty arthritis, systemic lupus erythematosus, and inflammatory bowel disease-associated arthritis. In contrast to psoriatic arthritis, rheumatoid arthritis tends to affect the proximal joints (e.g., the metacarpophalangeal joints), involves a greater number of joints than psoriatic arthritis, and affect them symmetrically. Involvement of the spinal joints is more suggestive of psoriatic arthritis than rheumatoid arthritis. Osteoarthritis shares certain clinical features with psoriatic arthritis such as its tendency to affect multiple distal joints in an asymmetric pattern. Unlike psoriatic arthritis, osteoarthritis does not typically involve inflammation of the sacroiliac joint. Psoriatic arthritis sometimes affects only one joint and is sometimes confused for gout or pseudogout when this happens.

Classification 
There are five main types of psoriatic arthritis:

 Oligoarticular: This type affects around 70% of patients and is generally mild. This type does not occur in the same joints on both sides of the body and usually only involves fewer than 3 joints.
 Polyarticular: This type accounts for around 25% of cases, and affects five or more joints on both sides of the body simultaneously. This type is most similar to rheumatoid arthritis and is disabling in around 50% of all cases.
 Arthritis mutilans: Affects less than 5% of patients and is a severe, deforming and destructive arthritis. This condition can progress over months or years causing severe joint damage. Arthritis mutilans has also been called chronic absorptive arthritis, and may be seen in rheumatoid arthritis as well.
 Spondyloarthritis: This type is characterized by stiffness of the neck or the sacroiliac joint of the spine, but can also affect the hands and feet, in a similar fashion to symmetric arthritis.
 Distal interphalangeal predominant: This type of psoriatic arthritis is found in about 5% of patients, and is characterized by inflammation and stiffness in the joints nearest to the ends of the fingers and toes. Nail changes are often marked.

Treatments 

The underlying process in psoriatic arthritis is inflammation; therefore, treatments are directed at reducing and controlling inflammation. Milder cases of psoriatic arthritis may be treated with NSAIDs alone; however, there is a trend toward earlier use of disease-modifying antirheumatic drugs or biological response modifiers to prevent irreversible joint destruction.

Nonsteroidal anti-inflammatory drugs 

Typically the medications first prescribed for psoriatic arthritis are NSAIDs such as ibuprofen and naproxen, followed by more potent NSAIDs like diclofenac, indomethacin, and etodolac. NSAIDs can irritate the stomach and intestine, and long-term use can lead to gastrointestinal bleeding. Coxibs (COX-2 inhibitors) e.g. Celecoxib or Etoricoxib, are associated with a statistically significant 50 to 66% relative risk reduction in gastrointestinal ulcers and bleeding complications compared to traditional NSAIDs, but carry an increased rate of cardiovascular events such as myocardial infarction (MI) or heart attack, and stroke. Both COX-2 inhibitors and other non-selective NSAIDS have potential adverse effects that include damage to the kidneys.

Conventional synthetic disease-modifying antirheumatic drugs (csDMARDs) 

Oral small molecules such as methotrexate, leflunomide, cyclosporin, azathioprine, and sulfasalazine are used in persistent symptomatic cases without exacerbation. Rather than just reducing pain and inflammation, this class of drugs helps slow down or halt the progression of the disease, and to therefore limit the amount of joint damage that occurs. Most DMARDs act slowly and may take weeks or even months to take full effect. According to a recent Cochrane review, low dose oral methotrexate was slightly more effective than placebos. Immunosuppressant drugs can also reduce psoriasis skin symptoms but can lead to liver and kidney problems and an increased risk of serious infection.

Biological DMARDs (bDMARDs) 
Biologics (also called biological response modifiers) are a class of therapeutics developed using recombinant DNA technology. Biologic medications are derived from living cells cultured in a laboratory. Unlike traditional DMARDS that affect the entire immune system, biologics target specific parts of the immune system. They are given by injection or intravenous (IV) infusion.

Biologics prescribed for psoriatic arthritis are TNF-α inhibitors, including infliximab, etanercept, golimumab, certolizumab pegol and adalimumab, as well as the IL-12/IL-23 inhibitor ustekinumab, the IL-17A inhibitor secukinumab, and the IL-23 inhibitor risankizumab.

Biologics may increase the risk of minor and serious infections. More rarely, they may be associated with nervous system disorders, blood disorders or certain types of cancer.

Phosphodiesterase-4 inhibitors 
A first-in-class treatment option for the management of psoriatic arthritis is apremilast; a small molecule phosphodiesterase-4 inhibitor approved for use by the FDA in 2014. By inhibiting PDE4, an enzyme which breaks down cyclic adenosine monophosphate, cAMP levels rise, resulting in the down-regulation of various pro-inflammatory factors including TNF-α, interleukin 17 and interleukin 23, as well as the up-regulation of anti-inflammatory factor interleukin 10.

It is given in tablet form and taken by mouth. Side effects include headaches, back pain, nausea, diarrhea, fatigue, nasopharyngitis and upper respiratory tract infections, as well as depression and weight loss.

It was patented in 2014 and manufactured by Celgene. There is no current generic equivalent available on the market.

JAK inhibitors 
The JAK1 inhibitors tofacitinib (Xeljanz) and upadacitinib (Rinvoq) are approved for the use in active psoriatic arthritis. The TYK2 inhibitor deucravacitinib (Sotyktu), which has been approved for plaque psoriasis, is currently undergoing a Phase II clinical trial to evaluate the efficacy and safety on psoriatic arthritis.

Other treatments 

A review found tentative evidence of benefit of low level laser therapy and concluded that it could be considered for relief of pain and stiffness associated RA.

Photochemotherapy with methoxy psoralen and long-wave ultraviolet light (PUVA therapy) are used for severe skin lesions. Doctors may use joint injections with corticosteroids in cases where one joint is severely affected. In psoriatic arthritis patients with severe joint damage orthopedic surgery may be implemented to correct joint destruction, usually with the use of a joint replacement. Surgery is effective for pain alleviation, correcting joint disfigurement, and reinforcing joint usefulness and strength.

Epidemiology 

Seventy percent of people who develop psoriatic arthritis first show signs of psoriasis on the skin, 15 percent develop skin psoriasis and arthritis at the same time, and 15 percent develop skin psoriasis following the onset of psoriatic arthritis.

Psoriatic arthritis can develop in people who have any level severity of psoriatic skin disease, ranging from mild to very severe. Studies have found that obesity is a significant risk factor and predictor of disease outcome. Other risk factors associated with an increase risk of developing psoriatic arthritis include severe psoriasis, nail psoriasis, scalp psoriasis, inverse psoriasis, and having a first-degree relative with PsA.

Psoriatic arthritis tends to appear about 10 years after the first signs of psoriasis. For the majority of people, this is between the ages of 30 and 55, but the disease can also affect children. The onset of psoriatic arthritis symptoms before symptoms of skin psoriasis is more common in children than adults.

More than 80% of patients with psoriatic arthritis will have psoriatic nail lesions characterized by nail pitting, separation of the nail from the underlying nail bed, ridging and cracking, or more extremely, loss of the nail itself (onycholysis).

Enthesitis is observed in 30 to 50% of patients and most commonly involves the plantar fascia and Achilles’ tendon, but it may cause pain around the patella, iliac crest, epicondyles, and supraspinatus insertions

Men and women are equally affected by this condition. Like psoriasis, psoriatic arthritis is more common among Caucasians than African or Asian people.

References

External links 
Psoriatic Arthritis at Patient.info
Guidelines of care for the management of psoriasis and psoriatic arthritis—National Guideline Clearinghouse
 US National Institute of Arthritis and Musculoskeletal and Skin Diseases

Arthritis
Autoimmune diseases
Psoriasis
Rheumatology